Similar to skydiving, space diving is the act of jumping from an aircraft or spacecraft in near space and falling towards Earth. The Kármán line is a common definition as to where space begins, 100 km (62 mi) above sea level. This definition is accepted by the Fédération Aéronautique Internationale (FAI), which is an international standard setting and record-keeping body for aeronautics and astronautics. The United States Air Force uses 50 mi (80 km) to award astronaut wings.

No successful space dives (above 100 km) have been completed to date.

Higher jumps from the mesosphere or thermosphere have yet to be successfully performed, though Orbital Outfitters, now defunct,  was working to create a suit that was supposed to enable space diving. Space diving from beyond the stratosphere was first imagined in 1934, appearing in E. E. "Doc" Smith's science fiction novel Triplanetary.

History
The first stratospheric space dive was in 1959 when Colonel Joseph William Kittinger II (July 27, 1928 - December 9, 2022) in Tampa, Florida, United States a former command pilot, career military officer and retired Colonel in the United States Air Force dived from a high-altitude balloon.

On 1 November 1962, Yevgeni Andreyev and Pyotr Dolgov ascended from Volsk, near Saratov. Dolgov was primarily testing an experimental pressure suit, and would have deployed a drogue chute like Kittinger's earlier jump. As he exited the gondola, he struck his helmet and cracked the visor, leading to depressurization and his death.

During the last attempt Piantanida's face mask had depressurized. Piantanida barely survived the fall, and the lack of oxygen left him brain damaged and in a coma from which he never recovered.

In the early 1990s, Kittinger played a lead role with NASA assisting British SAS Soldier Charles "Nish" Bruce to break his highest parachute jump record. The project was suspended in 1994 following Bruce's mental health breakdown.

In 1997 parachutist and pilot Cheryl Stearns formed Stratoquest, aiming to break Kittenger's record as the first female space diver. Due either to a significant shoulder injury or funding issues for the project this plan did not come to fruition. By the time Stearns was prepared to attempt her jump, Felix Baumgartner had completed his jump and Stearns shelved her event.

Challenges to safe space diving

There are several technical requirements and challenges to the possibility of space jumping. These requirements would be somewhat eased when entering the atmosphere from a simple drop, where the heat of reentry would be considerably less than that of reentering from orbit. At any given density of air, the terminal velocity of a person is much lower than that of a heavy spacecraft. This is because starting from a stationary platform means that fall speed never exceeds the local terminal velocity (though this is quite high in thin atmosphere) and a small light body slows down relatively quickly as the atmosphere thickens.

Parachutes would require increased strength to slow the higher weights associated with the added equipment.

NASA is known to have investigated the concept in case of an emergency situation on Space Shuttle orbiters where alternative methods of reentry are not available. However, such planning has not moved beyond the conceptual stage given the high energies involved in reentry from orbital speeds.

See also
Low Earth orbit, begins at around 160 km
Project Excelsior, c. 1960, including Kittinger
MOOSE, a study of an orbital bail-out system using a parachute
Red Bull Stratos

Jumpers and prospective jumpers
Yevgeni Nikolayevich Andreyev
Cheryl Stearns, plans for Stratoquest
Steve Truglia, plans for Space Jump
Michel Fournier, Le Grand Saut attempts
Nick Piantanida, died after Strato Jump III attempt in 1966
Olav Zipser, Free Fly Astronaut Project
Charles "Nish" Bruce
Victor Prather

Fictional accounts
In Dark Star, 1974 film, Doolittle decides to 'surf' on debris to the planet or die in the attempt.
Star Trek, a 2009 film which depicts a fictional space jump
Ad Astra, a 2014 film which depicts a fictional space jump

References

External links

The Red Bull Stratos Project
Orbital outfitters space diving suits
Joe Kittinger's 1960 space jump video.
Petruk's calculations about 500-km space jump

 
Parachuting
Ballooning